Silver hyponitrite is an ionic compound with formula Ag2N2O2 or 2[ON=NO]2−, containing monovalent silver cations and hyponitrite anions.  It is a bright canary yellow solid practically insoluble in water and most organic solvents, including DMF and DMSO.

Preparation
The compound was described in 1848.

The salt can be precipitated from a solution of sodium hyponitrite in water by the addition of silver nitrate:
 + 2  →  + 2 
Excess silver nitrate yields a brown or black precipitate.

Silver hyponitrite can be prepared also by reducing silver nitrate  with sodium amalgam.

Properties and reactions
Silver hyponitrite is sparingly soluble in concentrated alkali hyponitrite solutions, but quite soluble in aqueous ammonia due to the formation of the complex cation [()2Ag]+.  The compound is slowly decomposed by light.

The anhydrous compound decomposes in vacuum at 158 °C.  The primary decomposition products are silver(I) oxide  and nitrous oxide .  However, these then react to form a variable mixture of nitrogen, metallic silver, and various oxides of the two elements and silver salts.

Hyponitrous acid
Reaction of silver hyponitrite with anhydrous hydrogen chloride in ether is the standard way to prepare hyponitrous acid:
 + 2 HCl →  + 2 AgCl
Spectroscopic data indicate a trans configuration for the resulting acid.

Alkyl halides
Silver hyponitrite reacts with alkyl halides, to form alkyl hyponitrites.  For example, reaction with methyl bromide yields the spontaneously explosive liquid dimethyl hyponitrite:
 2  +  → -O-N=N-O- + 2 AgBr
Other alkyl hyponitrites reported in the literature include those of ethyl, benzyl, and tert-butyl.

References

Silver compounds
Nitrogen–oxygen compounds